Starter pack may refer to:

 Starter pack (meme), an internet meme
 Booster pack, a package of cards or figurines, also called a starter pack